Vaughn Groenewald (born 28 December 1974) is a South African professional golfer. He won the 2015 Zambia Sugar Open.

Professional career
Groenewald has played on the Sunshine Tour since 1995. He has won six times on tour, including the Zambia Sugar Open in 2015, the only one of his wins played over 72 holes.

Professional wins (6)

Sunshine Tour wins (6)

Sunshine Tour playoff record (1–4)

References

External links

South African male golfers
Sunshine Tour golfers
Sportspeople from the Western Cape
People from George, South Africa
White South African people
1974 births
Living people